Robert Tucker Abbott (September 28, 1919 – November 3, 1995) was an American conchologist (seashells) and malacologist (molluscs). He was the author of more than 30 books on malacology, which have been translated into many languages.

Abbott was one of the most prominent conchologists of the 20th century. He brought the study of seashells to the public with his works, including most notably: American Seashells (1954), Seashells of the World (1962), The Shell (1972), and The Kingdom of the Seashell (1972). He was an active member of the American Malacological Union and Conchologists of America.

Biography
Tucker Abbott was born in Watertown, Massachusetts.  His interest in seashells began early; he collected them as a boy and started a museum with a friend in his basement. After having spent part of his youth in Montreal, he went to Harvard University and became a student of William James Clench (1897–1984). In 1941, they started the journal Johnsonia, which specialized in western Atlantic molluscs. He graduated in 1942.

During World War II, Abbott was first a Navy bomber pilot, and later worked for the Medical Research Unit doing research on schistosomiasis. He documented the life cycle of the schistosome in Oncomelania, a small brown freshwater snail, which he studied in the rice fields of the Yangtze valley.

He married fellow malacologist Mary M. Sisler on February 18, 1946 and had three children, Robert Tucker, Jr., Carolyn Tucker and Cynthia Douglas.

After World War II, Abbott worked at the National Museum of Natural History, Smithsonian Institution (1944–1954) as Assistant Curator and Associate Curator of the Department of Mollusks.  During this time, he earned his Master's and Ph.D. at George Washington University and wrote the first edition of American Seashells.

He then went to the Academy of Natural Sciences in Philadelphia (1954–1969). He was chair of the Department of Mollusks, and held the Pilsbry Chair of Malacology. During that time he went on a number of shelling expeditions to the Indo-Pacific region. He also started his own journal, "Indo-Pacific Mollusca". He also was an active editor of the journal "The Nautilus".

In 1969, Abbott accepted the DuPont Chair of Malacology at the Delaware Museum of Nature & Science. He also headed the Department of Mollusks, and was Assistant Director. In 1971 he became editor-in-chief of The Nautilus.

Abbott was the Founding Director of Bailey-Matthews National Shell Museum on Sanibel Island. He died from pulmonary disease at his Sanibel Island home, on November 3, 1995, two weeks before the museum opened. He is buried in Arlington National Cemetery.

Taxa

Species named in his honor
A number of species were named in his honor (eponymous species):
 Armina abbotti Thompson, Cattaneo & Wong, 1990 (synonym of Armina wattla Ev. Marcus & Er. Marcus, 1967)
 Cassis abbotti Bouchet, 1988 
 Chemnitzia abbotti Robba, Di Geronimo, Chaimanee, Negri & Sanfilippo, 2004 
 Conus regius abbotti Clench, 1942 (now a synonym for Conus sphacelatus)
 Crenella abbotti Altena, 1968 (synonym of 	Crenella gemma Olsson & McGinty, 1958)
 Dolomena abbotti Dekkers & Liverani, 2011 
 Latirus abbotti Snyder, 2003 (synonym of Polygona abbotti (Snyder, 2003))
 Miralda abbotti Olsson & McGinty, 1958 
 Opalia abbotti Clench & Turner, 1952
 Odostomia abbotti Olsson & McGinty, 1958
 Plesiocystiscus abbotti (De Jong & Coomans, 1988) 
 Polygona abbotti (Snyder, 2003) 
 Pseudocyphoma abbotti (Cate, 1973) (synonym of Cyphoma intermedium (G.B. Sowerby I, 1828))
 Tonna galea abbotti Macsotay & Campos, 2001 (synonym of Tonna galea (Linnaeus, 1758))
 Volvarina abbotti de Jong & Coomans, 1988

Species named by him
Species named by Abbot include:
 Acteon eloiseae Abbott, 1973 
 Chicoreus (Phyllonotus) margaritensis (Abbott, 1958) - originally described as Murex margaritensis Abbott, 1958
 Chicoreus (Triplex) cosmani Abbott & Finlay, 1979
 Transennella gerrardi Abbott, 1958 (family Veneridae)
 Tudivasum zanzibaricum (Abbott, 1958) - originally described as Tudicula zanzibarica Abbott, 1958

Bibliography 

 R. Tucker Abbott : Introducing Seashells, 1955
 R. Tucker Abbott: How to know American Marine Shells, 1961

 R. Tucker Abbott :Van Nostrand’s Standard Catalog of shells, 1964
 
 
 
 
 Abbott, R. Tucker, 1974, American Seashells, Second edition, Van Nostrand Rheinhold, New York,  .

References

External links

1919 births
1995 deaths
20th-century American zoologists
American malacologists
Conchologists
Harvard College alumni
George Washington University alumni
People from Watertown, Massachusetts
Burials at Arlington National Cemetery
People from Lee County, Florida
United States Navy pilots of World War II